Cylindrepomus albicornis is a species of beetle in the family Cerambycidae. It was described by Nonfried in 1894. It is known from the Sunda Islands.

References

Dorcaschematini
Beetles described in 1894